Taleh Mammadov (born 16 August 1989, Qaradağlı, Azerbaijan) is an Azerbaijani Greco-Roman wrestler. He won one of the bronze medals in the 63 kg event at the 2022 World Wrestling Championships held in Belgrade, Serbia. He is a three-time medalist at the European Wrestling Championships.

Career 

In 2019, he won one of the bronze medals in the 63 kg event at the European Wrestling Championships held in Bucharest, Romania. In his bronze medal match he defeated Slavik Galstyan of Armenia.

In 2020, he competed in the men's 63 kg event at the Individual Wrestling World Cup held in Belgrade, Serbia. In 2021, he won the silver medal in the 63 kg event at the European Wrestling Championships held in Warsaw, Poland.

In 2022, he won one of the bronze medals in his event at the Vehbi Emre & Hamit Kaplan Tournament held in Istanbul, Turkey. He won the silver medal in the 63 kg event at the European Wrestling Championships held in Budapest, Hungary. A few months later, he won the gold medal in his event at the Matteo Pellicone Ranking Series 2022 held in Rome, Italy.

Achievements

References

External links 

 

Living people
1989 births
People from Goranboy District
Azerbaijani male sport wrestlers
European Wrestling Championships medalists
World Wrestling Championships medalists
21st-century Azerbaijani people